Armstrong Reef is a reef that encompasses many ice-free plutonic islets and rocks, extending for  from the south-west end of Renaud Island, in the Biscoe Islands of Antarctica. It was first accurately shown on an Argentine government chart of 1957, and was named by the UK Antarctic Place-Names Committee for Terence Armstrong, a British sea ice specialist.

Important Bird Area
The reef has been identified as a 557 ha Important Bird Area by BirdLife International because it supports a breeding colony of over 500 pairs of Antarctic shags.

References 

Reefs of Graham Land
Landforms of the Biscoe Islands
Important Bird Areas of Antarctica
Seabird colonies